Athrinacia is a moth genus of the family Depressariidae.

Species
 Athrinacia cosmophragma Meyrick, 1922
 Athrinacia leucographa Walsingham, 1911
 Athrinacia psephophragma Meyrick, 1929
 Athrinacia trifasciata Walsingham, 1911
 Athrinacia xanthographa Walsingham, 1911

References

 
Depressariinae
Taxa named by Thomas de Grey, 6th Baron Walsingham
Moth genera